Baba Kashmira Singh is head of the Sidhant Sant Samaj or Gurbani (Gurmati) Sidhant Pracharak Sant Samaj, a pro-Gurmat organization in Jalandhar, India. Formed in January, 1999, the organization rose to demand the removal of the controversial Gurcharan Singh Tohra from the Sant Samaj.

Prior to Baba Kashmira Singh's emergence as a religious figure, he served as a police official. His behavior as a religious leader, such as the promotion of the unity of religions, has sometimes created controversy among the Sikh community; in 1999, he was called before the collective body of Akal Takht to defend his allegedly "'heretical' activities". In an interview, Baba Kashmira Singh declared, "I believe a religion should be flexible and change with the times."
He Started Initiating Satsang From Guru Granth Sahib Ji & Other Holy Books From 1 January 1982 Till Now By The Blessing Of His Satguru Swami Gurbachan Lal Ji Maharaj
He is the founder of SGL Charitable Hospital in Jalandhar, a non-profit, acute care hospital with 500 beds, part of the Jan Sewa Trust he runs. He is known all over the world for formation of Eye Bank, Anti drug Addiction Campaign, Breast/uterus cancer eradication, old age home, anti-dowry drive and nation soul refund.

References

External links
SGL Jan Sewa Kendar home page
SGL Charitable Hospital home page

People from Jalandhar
Year of birth missing (living people)
Living people